A. sieboldii  may refer to:
 Anotogaster sieboldii, the oniyanma, the largest dragonfly species native to Japan
 Amphiesma sieboldii, the Sikkim keelback, a grass snake species found in South Asia

Synonyms
 Aralia sieboldii, a synonym for Fatsia japonica, the fatsi or Japanese aralia, a plant species native to southern Japan

See also
 Sieboldii